Squires were men-at-arms in the service of knights in feudal or medieval times.

Squires may also refer to:

 Squires (surname)
 Squires, Missouri, United States
 Columbian Squires, an international youth fraternity
 Jersey Squires, a defunct basketball team
 Petrolia Squires, a Canadian ice hockey team
 Canadian Squires, a band that became The Band
 Virginia Squires, a basketball franchise

See also
 The Squires (disambiguation)
 USS George P. Squires (SP-303), a United States Navy patrol vessel and minesweeper in commission from 1917 to 1918
 Gerideau-Squires
 Squires Gate